Veronica traversii, synonym Hebe traversii, is an ornamental plant of the family Plantaginaceae. It is endemic to the south island of New Zealand. The specific epithet traversii is in honor of naturalist Henry H. Travers (1844-1928), son of William Thomas Locke Travers.

References

traversii
Flora of New Zealand
Taxa named by Joseph Dalton Hooker